Jesper Smink (born 15 December 1997) is a Dutch judoka. Up to April 23 2021, he has won 5 medals in the IJF World Tour  and he has participated in 2 Senior World Championships and 4 Senior Continental Championships.

On 12 November 2022 he won a silver medal at the 2022 European Mixed Team Judo Championships as part of team Netherlands.

References

External links
 
 
 

1997 births
Living people
Dutch male judoka
Sportspeople from Amersfoort
European Games competitors for the Netherlands
Judoka at the 2019 European Games
20th-century Dutch people
21st-century Dutch people